Shakira Barrera (born 1990) is an American dancer and actress. She joined the cast of the Netflix series GLOW in its second season.

Early life and education
Barrera was born in Englewood, New Jersey, to Nicaraguan-American parents and attended the Bergen County Academies. Barrera earned a Bachelor of Fine Arts at Rutgers University, where she studied dance.

Career
In 2018, Barrera was added to the cast of the television series GLOW. Her character, Yolanda, is a stripper and a lesbian, who joins the cast when an original wrestler leaves.

Personal life
Barrera makes monthly donations to, and has organized fund-raising events for, a charity that helps disabled people in Nicaragua.

Filmography

References

External links 
 

1990 births
Date of birth missing (living people)
Living people
21st-century American actresses
21st-century American dancers
American people of Nicaraguan descent
Dancers from New Jersey
People from Englewood, New Jersey
Rutgers University alumni
American film actresses
American television actresses